Henry Anderson may refer to:

Politics
Henry Anderson (merchant) (c. 1484–1559), English merchant and politician
Henry Anderson (politician) (1545–1605), English merchant and politician
Henry Anderson (Cavalier) (1582–1659), English Royalist and politician
Henry W. Anderson (1870–1954), United States attorney and leader of the Republican Party in Virginia

Sports
Henry Anderson (American football) (born 1991), American football player
Henry Anderson (English cricketer) (1803–1873), English cricketer
Henry Anderson (Indian cricketer) (1867–1914), Indian cricketer
Henry Anderson (footballer) (1892–1926), Australian rules footballer

Other
Henry Anderson (street vendor) (1800–?), American street vendor
Henry James Anderson (1799–1875), American scientist
Henry Charles Lennox Anderson (1853–1924), Australian scientist and librarian
Henry Pope Anderson (1927–2016), farm labor union organizer, activist, author, and historian

See also
Harry Anderson (disambiguation)